Burmese salads (transliterated athoke or athouk) are a diverse category of indigenous salads in Burmese cuisine. Burmese salads are made of cooked and raw ingredients that are mixed by hand to combine and balance a wide-ranging array of flavors and textures. Burmese salads are eaten as standalone snacks, as side dishes paired with Burmese curries, and as entrees. The iconic laphet thoke (fermented tea leaf salad) is traditionally eaten as a palate cleanser at the end of a meal.

Ingredients 

Burmese salads are typically centered on one major ingredient, ranging from starches (e.g., rice and noodles) and cooked ingredients (e.g., Burmese fritters and proteins) to raw fruits and vegetables. Common starches used in Burmese salads include rice, egg noodles, rice vermicelli, rice noodles, and potatoes. Burmese salads may also feature raw vegetables and fruits, such as tomatoes, cabbage, onions, kaffir lime, long beans, and mangoes. Fermented ingredients, including lahpet (pickled tea leaves), ngapi (fish paste), pon ye gyi (fermented bean paste), and pickled ginger, also feature prominently in several classic Burmese salads.

The salad ingredients are dressed with various seasonings, including chili oil, garlic oil, and sesame oil, toasted chickpea flour, lime juice, fish sauce, tamarind paste, peanuts, and fried garlic, and then thoroughly mixed by hand. Aromatic fresh herbs like coriander, mint, lime leaves, and green onions are also used to garnish Burmese salads.

List of Burmese salads

While the repertoire of Burmese salads has not been codified, Burmese salads are invariably suffixed with the word "-thoke" (သုပ်) in the Burmese language. Burmese salads are typically named after the salad's central ingredient (e.g., pomelo, ginger, etc.). Common Burmese salads are listed below.

Fermented products 

 Gyin thoke (ဂျင်းသုပ်) – salad of shredded pickled ginger, with sesame seeds and assorted fried beans
 Laphet thoke – a salad of pickled tea leaves with fried chickpeas, peanuts and garlic, toasted sesame, fresh garlic, tomato, green chili, crushed dried shrimps, dressed with peanut oil, fish sauce and lime
 Ngachin thoke (ငါးချဉ်သုပ်) - a salad of ngachin (pressed sour fish), garlic, shallots, fresh chillies, and coriander 
 Ngapi thoke (ငါးပိသုပ်) – salad of ngapi (fermented fish paste)
 Pon ye gyi thoke (ပုန်းရည်ကြီးသုပ်) – a salad from Upper Myanmar, featuring pon ye gyi (fermented bean paste), raw diced onions and shallots, and dried shrimp
 Hsei be u thoke (ဆေးဘဲဥသုပ်) – a salad made with century eggs, raw shallots, and julienned cabbage and carrots

Vegetables and herbs 

 Gazun ywet thoke (ကန်စွန်းရွက်သုပ်) - a salad made with blanched water spinach, lime juice, fried garlic and garlic oil, roasted rice powder and dried shrimp
 Khayanchin thi thoke (ခရမ်းချဉ်သီးသုပ်) – a salad made with raw tomatoes, raw shallots, and dried shrimp powder
 Khayan thi miphok thoke (ခရမ်းသီးမီးဖုတ်သုပ်) – a salad made with fire-roasted eggplant, shallots, and ngapi
 Kyaukpwint thoke (ကျောက်ပွင့်သုပ်) – a sour Rakhine salad made with kyaukpwint, an edible seaweed
 Magyi ywet thoke (မန်ကျည်းရွက်သုပ်) – an Upper Myanmar salad featuring tender blanched tamarind leaves, garlic, onions, roasted peanuts, and pounded dried shrimp
 Mezali phu thoke (မယ်ဇလီဖူးသုပ်) – a salad of freshly picked Siamese cassia flower buds, boiled potatoes, sliced onions, peanuts, and sesame seeds, traditionally eaten during the full moon day of Tazaungmon
 Mon-la-u thoke (မုန်လာဥသုပ်) – a salad made with sliced radish, vinegar, and chilis
 Myinkhwa ywet thoke (မြင်းခွာရွက်သုပ်) – an herbal salad featuring pennywort leaves dressed with lime juice and fish sauce
 Pethi thoke (ပဲသီးသုပ်) – a salad of blanched and chopped green beans, and fried onions
 Tama ywet thoke (တမာရွက်သုပ်) – a salad made with bitter neem leaves

Fruits 

Shauk thi thoke (ရှောက်သီးသုပ်) – a salad of sliced lemon or kaffir lime (no pith or rind), toasted chickpea flour, crushed roasted peanut, crushed dried shrimp, crushed dried chili, baked fish paste, cooked oil with onions (often served with kya zan hinga)
Kywegaw thi thoke (ကျွဲကောသီးသုပ်) – a salad of pomelo and shallots dressed in dried shrimp powder, chickpea flour, and fish sauce
Mayan thi thoke (မရမ်းသီးသုပ်နည်း) – a salad made with sour marian plums and dried shrimp
Ngapyawbu thoke (ငှက်ပျောဖူးသုပ်) – a salad of cooked banana flowers, peanuts, and sesame seeds
Thayet thi thoke (သရက်သီးသုပ်) – a salad of julienned green mangoes, mixed with dried shrimp, onions, garlic, and chilis
Thayet chin thoke – Fermented green mango salad with onions, green chilli, roasted peanuts, sesame and peanut oil
 Thinbaw thi thoke – a salad of shredded green papaya, mixed with ground dried shrimp, onions, and fried garlic; tossed in garlic oil, lemon juice, and a little hot chili pepper

Seafood and meat 
Bazun thoke (ပုဇွန်သုပ်) – pickled prawn salad
Kinmun thoke (ကင်းမွန်သုပ်) – a sour and spicy salad made with cooked cuttlefish
Kyettha thoke (ကြက်သားသုပ်) – a salad of shredded chicken, tomatoes, and shallots dressed in chickpea flour, fish sauce, turmeric, and lime
Kyetchidauk thoke (ကြက်ခြေထောက်သုပ်) – a sour and spicy salad made with chicken feet
Ngaphe thoke (ငါးဖယ်သုပ်) – a salad of bronze featherback fishcakes, diced raw shallots, and raw tomatoes
Nga baung thoke – mixed vegetables and prawn, wrapped in morinda leaves and banana leaves outside
Pyigyi nga thoke (ပြည်ကြီးငါးသုပ်) – a salad made with cooked squid

Rice and noodles 

Htamin thoke (ထမင်းသုပ်; ‌) – Rice salad with tomato puree, potato, glass noodle, toasted chickpea flour, crushed toasted dried fermented beancake, crushed dried shrimp, crushed dried chilli, garlic and dressed with cooked peanut oil, fish sauce, lime or tamarind and coriander
 Khauk swè thoke (ခေါက်ဆွဲသုပ်; ‌) – Wheat noodle salad with dried shrimps, shredded cabbage and carrots, dressed with fried peanut oil, fish sauce and lime
Kya zan thoke – Glass vermicelli salad with boiled prawn julienne and mashed curried duck eggs and potatoes
 Let thoke sone (လက်သုပ်စုံ) – similar to htamin thoke with shredded green papaya, shredded carrot, ogonori sea moss, wheat noodles, and glass noodles
Mont di thoke (မုန့်တီသုပ်) – a variety of regional salads featuring rice vermicelli called mont di 
 Nan gyi thoke (နန်းကြီးသုပ်‌) – Thick rice noodle salad with chickpea flour, chicken, fish cake (nga hpe), onions, coriander, spring onions, crushed dried chilli, dressed with fried crispy onion oil, fish sauce and lime
 Nanbyagyi thoke (နန်းပြား‌ကြီးသုပ်) – As above with tagliatelle.

Other 

Samuza thoke – a salad of cut samosa pieces with onions, cabbage, fresh mint, light potato curry broth, masala, chili powder, salt and lime
Tophu thoke – a salad of Fresh Burmese tofu slices, dressed and garnished with peanut oil, dark soy sauce, garlic, and lime leaves

Regional adaptations

Cambodia 

Mee kola ( or ), commonly called Burmese-style noodles, is a Cambodian noodle dish that originated among the Kola people, who originally descended from Burmese migrants to Cambodia's northwest. The noodle salad consists of steamed rice vermicelli, cooked with soy sauce and garlic chives, and served with pickled vegetables (e.g., papaya, carrot, and cucumber), hardboiled eggs, sweet garlic fish sauce, dried shrimp, and crushed peanuts, and garnished with lime and chili flakes. The dish has become a popular street food in Cambodia.

India
Following the 1962 Burmese coup d'état, over 300,000 Burmese Indians returned to their ancestral homes in India. Many refugees settled in the port city of Madras (now Chennai), where a community around Burma Bazaar in George Town formed. Burmese Indian refugees there became street hawkers, selling a dish locally called atho (அத்தோ), which is an adaptation of khauk swe thoke, the Burmese noodle salad. Atho is a mixture of noodles, shredded cabbage and onions garnished with tamarind, salt, fried onions, chili flakes, garlic and ajinomoto seasoning.

See also
Burmese cuisine

References

External links

Burmese cuisine
Salads